Thyretes ustjuzhanini is a moth in the subfamily Arctiinae. It was described by Vladimir Viktorovitch Dubatolov in 2012 and is endemic to Zimbabwe.

References

External links

Moths described in 2012
Endemic fauna of Zimbabwe
Syntomini
Moths of Africa